Glipa franciscoloi is a species of beetle in the genus Glipa. It was described by Takakuwa in 2000.

References

franciscoloi
Beetles described in 2000